The Return of Peter Grimm is a 1935 American drama film directed George Nicholls, Jr. from a screenplay by Francis Edward Faragoh based upon the 1911 Broadway play of the same name by David Belasco.  Produced by Kenneth Macgowan and released by RKO Radio Pictures on September 13, 1935, it stars Lionel Barrymore, Helen Mack, Edward Ellis, and Donald Meek.

Previously filmed by Fox Film Corporation in 1926 as a silent film, The Return of Peter Grimm.

A business owner disbelieves in the afterlife, until he dies and returns as a ghost. When he learns that his intended heir plans to sell the business, the ghost tries to sabotage the heir's arranged marriage.

Plot
The owner of a  thriving, generations-old nursery business, Peter Grimm is determined to marry off Catherine, an orphan he has raised to young womanhood, to his nephew Frederik. Catherine, who does not love Frederik, reluctantly agrees to marry him just to please her benefactor. Meanwhile, James, Grimm's secretary, is secretly in love with Catherine.

Grimm scoffs at his doctor and old friend, Andrew Macpherson, for his belief in the afterlife and seances, but after he dies, is chagrined to find his friend is right. As a ghost, he is disgusted when he finds his nephew is planning to sell the business to a despised longtime rival. Grimm tries to prevent the marriage he arranged.

Cast
Lionel Barrymore - Peter Grimm
Helen Mack - Catherine
Edward Ellis - Dr. Andrew Macpherson
Donald Meek - Everett Bartholomew
George Breakston - William
Allen Vincent - Frederik
 James Bush - James
Ethel Griffies - Mrs. Martha Bartholomew
Lucien Littlefield - Colonel Tom Lawton
Greta Meyer - Marta
Ray Mayer - The Clown

See also
Lionel Barrymore filmography

References

External links

1935 films
1935 drama films
1930s fantasy films
1930s ghost films
American black-and-white films
American drama films
American films based on plays
Films about the afterlife
Films directed by George Nicholls Jr.
Remakes of American films
RKO Pictures films
Sound film remakes of silent films
1930s American films
Films with screenplays by Francis Edward Faragoh
Films about inheritances
Arranged marriage in fiction